Marion Scheepers is a South African-born mathematician, lecturer and researcher in the Department of Mathematics of Boise State University in Boise, Idaho since 1988. He is particularly known for his work on selection principles and on infinite topological and set-theoretical games. He introduced themes that are common to many selection principles and is responsible for the Scheepers diagram.

Life 
Scheepers was born in December 1957, in Thabazimbi, South Africa. He completed his Ph.D. thesis entitled The Meager-Nowhere Dense Game at the University of Kansas under the supervision of Fred Galvin. His research interests cover set theory and its relatives, game theory, cryptology, elementary number theory and algorithmic phenomena in biology. He was appointed Assistant Professor in the Department of Mathematics at Boise State University (BSU) in 1988 and promoted to Associate Professor in 1993. He has been Professor in the Department of Mathematics at BSU since 1996.

In 2016 he was part of a group at BSU that started an interdisciplinary course called Transdisciplinary Research Methods. In 2019 Scheepers was one of the coaches for BSU's elective Vertically Integrated Projects including Portable Secure Devices, a team aiming to develop methods to mitigate cyber-threats against active implantable medical devices.

Presently, Scheepers is studying biological encryption mechanisms in certain single-cell organisms in collaboration with researchers from the University of Witten-Herdecke in Germany, and the BSU Department of Biological Sciences. For this study, he has received grant funding from the National Science Foundation. The National Science Foundation has funded his research and curriculum activities on several occasions, including in 2005 for Crypto Systems in Ciliates

Recognition, awards, membership 
2012 Distinguished Professor in Mathematics, Boise State University.
2014 BSU recognised Scheepers' 26 years of academic service.
2017 The conference Frontiers of Selection Principles at Cardinal Stefan Wyszyński University in Warsaw, Poland was dedicated to Scheepers.

Selected publications

References

External links 
 European Mathematical Information Service
 Marion Scheepers publications at the American Mathematical Society
 

1957 births
Living people
South African mathematicians
University of Kansas alumni
Boise State University faculty